Happy Valley is a chain of amusement parks located in various cities of China. The first park opened in 1998 in Shenzhen, Guangdong province. Since then seven more amusement parks have opened in Beijing, Chengdu, Shanghai, Wuhan, Tianjin, Chongqing and Nanjing.

Locations

See also
 Fantawild, another chain of amusement parks in China

References

External links
 
 

 
1998 establishments in China
Amusement parks in China